Pindorama is a 1970 Brazilian drama film directed by Arnaldo Jabor. It was entered into the 1971 Cannes Film Festival.

Cast
 Maurício do Valle
 Ítala Nandi
 Jesus Pingo
 Hugo Carvana
 José De Freitas
 Wilson Grey
 Vinícius Salvatori
 Tep Kahok
 Maria Regina
 Manoel De Gaveira
 Raimundo Arcanjo
 Jacena R. Costa
 Harildo Deda
 Mário Gusmão

References

External links

1970 films
Brazilian drama films
1970s Portuguese-language films
1970 drama films
Films directed by Arnaldo Jabor